Khasimpet is a village in India, located in the Karimnagar district of Telangana, under the Ganneruvaram mandal. Recently, the gramasabha changed the village name as Manasavaram.

Villages in Karimnagar district